Alexander Kinvi-Boh (born December 20, 1991) is a Togolese footballer. He currently plays for US Masséda.

Career
He started football at his early ages Dallas FC (regional) and Guepards FC (National level). He started at the age of 13 at the position of defensive midfielder before playing as central defender and right full back in the late 2 years. 2004-2005 was voted the best young defender National division 2 league with Guepards FC. He was a member of the 2005-2006 Champions of National division 2 league with USM. Kinvi-Boh started in summer 2007 with the first team of US Masséda his professional career and played alongtime with Backer Aloenouvo. This victory earned the club a Promotion from division/league 2 to league 1 (top league). Played African Confederation Cup with USM (2008) after being 2nd in Togo Division 1 league. They were kicked out of the CAF confederation at the 1/8 stage of the championship in 2008.  A member of the Winning team of the Togolese National U-17 Inter-league Cup. After the CAF Orange Confederations Cup, he has been in top shape at the peak of football and uis the current captain of his team USM.

International
Kinvi-Boh played with the U-17 from Togo at 2007 FIFA U-17 World Cup in South Korea. Since 2008 Alex is member of the Togolese first national team. In 2006-2007 he earned his first National medal for placing second in the African U-17 Caf Tournament (hosted in Togo.) 2007 - Winners of Togo Independence Cup with USM. Played U-17 World Cup in SOUTH KOREA (part of starting 11). Award the best Togolese player at U-17 World Cup in Korea as a defender. He is a member of the 2010 African Cup of Nations team for Togo, in Angola  2010.

References

External links
 

1991 births
Living people
Togolese footballers
Togo international footballers
Association football defenders
21st-century Togolese people